"The Man Who Traveled in Elephants" is a short story written in 1948 by Robert A. Heinlein.  It was first published as "The Elephant Circuit" in the October 1957 issue of Saturn Magazine.  It later appeared in two Heinlein anthologies,  The Unpleasant Profession of Jonathan Hoag (also titled 6xH; 1959) and The Fantasies of Robert A. Heinlein (1999).

Though this story was not typical of the subject matter of most of Heinlein's writing, it was Heinlein's favorite. It has had a mixed reception compared to his other works. Spider Robinson selected it as one of his life-time favorite stories, and included it in his anthology Best of All Possible Worlds on that basis. Alexei Panshin said that the story "...is a mistake, a sloppy, sentimental fantasy that I suspect was written at the very beginning of Heinlein's career and then went without a buyer until 1957".

The story can be viewed as an early manifestation of Heinlein's World as Myth, which featured prominently in his last novels.

The protagonist is a widower who once was a traveling salesman working with his wife.  The two of them continued to travel after retirement, scouting territory in order to sell elephants.  It becomes clear that these travels were not seriously intended to sell elephants, but were rather a way to continue the life the two had previously enjoyed. On their travels the two of them were accompanied by a collection of imaginary animals. After his wife's death, the protagonist tries to continue this life, but with fading energy and interest. We join him on a bus ride to "The Fair" which he slowly realizes is the afterlife.

The story is usually described as a fantasy. The only fantastic element, however, is the narrator's entry into the afterlife, where he meets with his dead wife and dog, and with the imaginary animals he and his wife invented as traveling companions, as well as a host of other friends. The tone is realistic, as are the descriptions of the narrator's life before he boards the Bus to the Fair. After consideration, it could be considered magic realism.

See also 

 The Fantasies of Robert A. Heinlein

References

External links

Review by Robert Wilfred Franson
SFFaudio.com Review of the audio drama version
Brief review by Mark L. Olson

Short stories by Robert A. Heinlein
1948 short stories
Works originally published in American magazines
Works originally published in science fiction magazines